Robert "Chance" Browne (born June 17, 1948) is an American comic strip artist and cartoonist, painter, and musician. He was born in New York City.

After his father Dik Browne died in 1989, Browne took over drawing the family comic strip Hi and Lois. The comic is syndicated throughout the United States and stars the characters Hi, Lois, Dot, Ditto, Chip, and Trixie. Hi and Lois is a part of King Features, as is the other Browne family comic strip Hägar the Horrible (done by Chance's brother Chris).

Chance Browne also plays guitar and sings in his band The Twinkies, a group that was formed in 1973. He has attended both Park College in Missouri and the School of Visual Arts in New York City. While he makes a living as a cartoonist, he has a true passion for painting, which he does in his spare time. Browne lives in Connecticut with his wife and three daughters.

References
Strickler, Dave. Syndicated Comic Strips and Artists, 1924–1995: The Complete Index. Cambria, CA: Comics Access, 1995. 

1948 births
Living people
American cartoonists
Artists from New York City
People from Wilton, Connecticut
Park University alumni
School of Visual Arts alumni